Charlotte-Arrisoa Rafenomanjato (1936 – November 4, 2008) was a Malagasy writer mainly writing in French.

Life and career 
The daughter of a doctor, she trained as a midwife and pediatric nurse. She lived in Antananarivo. Her writing included two collections of poetry and several short stories which were not published.

Rafenomanjato served as honorary president of the Indian Ocean Writers Society.

She died at the nuns' clinic in Ankadifotsy from pulmonary complications.

Selected works 
Source:

Plays 
 Le prix de la Paix, received the Radio France Internationale prize in 1986, adapted for film and presented at the Festival of African Films in Montreal in 1988
 La Pécheresse, received the Radio France International prize in 1987
 L'Oiseau de Proie, presented at the French Madagascan Literature in Antananarivo in 1991
 Le Troupeau, translated into English and presented at the Festival of Contemporary Theatre in New York City

Novels 
 Pétale Ecarlate (1990)
 Le Cinquième Sceau (1994)

Essays 
 La Marche de la Liberté (1992)

References 

1936 births
2008 deaths
Malagasy women writers
Malagasy dramatists and playwrights
Malagasy novelists
Malagasy essayists
Women dramatists and playwrights
Women novelists
Women essayists
20th-century Malagasy poets
Malagasy women poets
20th-century dramatists and playwrights
20th-century novelists
20th-century essayists
20th-century women writers